Kasipat Chograthin (born 24 September 1994) is a Thai swimmer. He competed in the men's 50 metre backstroke event at the 2018 FINA World Swimming Championships (25 m), in Hangzhou, China. In 2019, he competed in two events at the 2019 World Aquatics Championships held in Gwangju, South Korea.

References

1994 births
Living people
Kasipat Chograthin
Male backstroke swimmers
Place of birth missing (living people)
Swimmers at the 2018 Asian Games
Kasipat Chograthin
Kasipat Chograthin